Walter Bellamy (6 November 1904 – 19 October 1978) was a professional footballer who played for Ilford, Tufnell Park , Dulwich Hamlet, Tottenham Hotspur and Brighton & Hove Albion.

Football career 
Bellamy played for non–league sides Ilford, Tufnell Park, and Dulwich Hamlet before joining Tottenham Hotspur. The outside left played a total of 73 matches and scoring 10 goals for the Lilywhites in all competitions between 1927 and 1934. He moved to Brighton & Hove Albion in 1935 where he went on to feature in a further three matches.

References 

1904 births
1978 deaths
Footballers from Tottenham
English footballers
Association football outside forwards
Ilford F.C. players
Tufnell Park F.C. players
Dulwich Hamlet F.C. players
Tottenham Hotspur F.C. players
Brighton & Hove Albion F.C. players
English Football League players